Wesley Alex Maiolino, known as Alex (born 10 February 1988), is a Brazilian footballer who plays as a forward.

Career
He joined Ulsan Hyundai Mipo in 2012 and became the first-ever foreign player of the Korea National League.

Honours 

Individual
K League 2 Best XI (with Goyang Hi): 2013, 2014

References

External links 

1988 births
Living people
Association football forwards
Brazilian footballers
Brazilian expatriate footballers
Clube Atlético Joseense players
Ulsan Hyundai Mipo Dockyard FC players
Daegu FC players
FC Anyang players
Seoul E-Land FC players
Associação Desportiva São Caetano players
Oeste Futebol Clube players
Korea National League players
K League 2 players
Expatriate footballers in South Korea
Brazilian expatriate sportspeople in South Korea
Wesley Alex Maiolino
Expatriate footballers in Thailand
Brazilian expatriate sportspeople in Thailand
Wesley Alex Maiolino